The 1989 European Parliament election for the election of the delegation from the Netherlands was held on 15 June 1989. This is the 3rd time the elections had been held for the European elections in the Netherlands.

Sources for everything below:

Numbering of the candidates list 
The official order and names of candidate lists:

| colspan="6" | 
|-
! style="background-color:#E9E9E9;text-align:center;vertical-align:top;" colspan=5 | Lists
|-
!style="background-color:#E9E9E9;text-align:center;" colspan="3"|List
!style="background-color:#E9E9E9;| English translation
!style="background-color:#E9E9E9;| List name (Dutch)

|-
| 1
| 
| style="text-align:left;" | list
| style="text-align:left;" | Labour Party/European Socialists
| style="text-align:left;" | Partij van de Arbeid/Europese Socialisten

|-
| 2
| 
| style="text-align:left;" | list
| style="text-align:left;" | CDA European People's Party
| style="text-align:left;" | CDA Europese Volkspartij

|-
| 3
| 
| style="text-align:left;" | list
| style="text-align:left;" | VVD - European Liberal-Democrats
| style="text-align:left;" | VVD - Europese Liberaal-Democraten

|-
| 4
| 
| style="text-align:left;" | list
| style="text-align:left;" | Rainbow (ppr-psp-cpn-evp-gpn-indep.)
| style="text-align:left;" | Regenboog (ppr-psp-cpn-evp-gpn-onafh.)

|-
| 5
| 
| style="text-align:left;" | list
| style="text-align:left;" | SGP, GPV and RPF
| style="text-align:left;" | SGP, GPV en RPF

|-
| 6
| 
| style="text-align:left;" | list
| style="text-align:left;" colspan="2" | D66

|-
| 7
| 
| style="text-align:left;" | list
| style="text-align:left;" | Socialist Party
| style="text-align:left;" | Socialistiese Partij

|-
| 8
| 
| style="text-align:left;" | list
| style="text-align:left;" | God with Us
| style="text-align:left;" | God met Ons

|-
| 9
| 
| style="text-align:left;" | list
| style="text-align:left;" | Initiative for European Democracy IDE
| style="text-align:left;" | Initiatief voor Europese Democratie IDE

|-
| 10
| 
| style="text-align:left;" | list
| style="text-align:left;" | List Janmaat / Centre Democrats
| style="text-align:left;" | Lijst Janmaat / Centrumdemocraten

|-
|}

Candidate lists

Labour Party/European Socialists 

Below is the candidate list for the Labour Party for the 1989 European Parliament election

Elected members are in bold

CDA European People's Party 

Below is the candidate list for the Christian Democratic Appeal for the 1989 European Parliament election

Elected members are in bold

VVD - European Liberal-Democrats 

Below is the candidate list for the People's Party for Freedom and Democracy for the 1989 European Parliament election

Elected members are in bold

Rainbow (ppr-psp-cpn-evp-gpn-indep.) 

Below is the candidate list for Rainbow (ppr-psp-cpn-evp-gpn-indep.) for the 1989 European Parliament election

Elected members are in bold

SGP, GPV and RPF 

Below is the candidate list for SGP, GPV and RPF for the 1989 European Parliament election

Elected members are in bold

D66 

Below is the candidate list for the Democrats 66 for the 1989 European Parliament election

Elected members are in bold

Socialist Party 

Below is the candidate list for Socialist Party for the 1989 European Parliament election

God with Us 

Below is the candidate list for the God with Us for the 1989 European Parliament election

Initiative for European Democracy IDE 
Below is the candidate list for the Initiative for European Democracy IDE for the 1989 European Parliament election

List Janmaat / Centre Democrats 

Below is the candidate list for the List Janmaat / Centre Democrats for the 1989 European Parliament election

References 

1989
Netherlands